Eli Whitney (1765–1825) was an American inventor and entrepreneur, best known for his cotton gin and his pursuit of interchangeability in firearms manufacture.

Eli Whitney may also refer to:
 Eli Whitney Jr. (1820–1825), son of the inventor, maker of the Colt Walker revolver
 Eli Whitney Museum in the U.S. state of Connecticut
 Eli Whitney, North Carolina, an unincorporated community in the U.S. state of North Carolina

See also
 His nephew Eli Whitney Blake, an inventor
 His grand-nephew Eli Whitney Blake, Jr., a scientist
 Eli Whitney Students Program at Yale College